This is a list of the 300 members who were elected to the Hellenic Parliament in the 2019 legislative election, held on 7 July 2019.

The parliament convened on 17 July 2019.

Composition

Members of Parliament 
Note: The table of changes below records all changes in party affiliation.

Changes

See also 
 2019 Greek legislative election
 Cabinet of Kyriakos Mitsotakis

References 

Ministry of Interior

2019
2019 in Greek politics
Greece